German articles are used similarly to the English articles, a and the. However, they are declined differently according to the number, gender and case of their nouns.

Declension
The inflected forms depend on the number, the case and the gender of the corresponding noun. German articleslike adjectives and pronounshave the same plural forms for all three genders.

Indefinite article
This article, ein-, is used equivalently to the word a in English. Like its English equivalent (though unlike Spanish), it has no direct form for a plural; in this situation a range of alternatives such as einige (some; several) or manche (some) would be used. 

 
The same endings are used for the negative indefinite article-like word (kein-), and the adjectival possessive pronouns (alias: possessive adjectives, possessive determiners), mein- (my), dein- (your (singular)), sein- (his), ihr- (her and their), unser- (our), euer/eur- (your (plural)), Ihr- (your if addressing an authority figure, always capitalised).

Definite article
This table gives endings for the definite article, equivalent to English the.

The so-called "der words" (Der-Wort) take similar endings. Examples are demonstrative pronouns (dies-, jen-) (this, that), the relative pronoun (welch-) (which), jed- (every), manch- (many), solch- (such).

 Note that this is essentially the same as the indefinite article table, but with the masculine nominative -er, and the neuter nominative and accusative -es.

"Possessive article-like" pronouns 
Under some circumstances (e.g. in a relative clause) the regular possessive pronouns are "replaced" by the genitive forms of other pronouns. English equivalents could be, "The king, whose army Napoleon had defeated..." or "The Himalayas, the highest parts of which were as yet unsurveyed...". They agree in number and gender with the possessor. Unlike other pronouns they carry no strength. Any adjective following them in the phrase will carry the strong endings.

Definite possessive [of the] (mixed) — i.e. the genitive of the demonstrative pronoun der:
 Masculine/Neuter: dessen
 Feminine/Plural: deren

Interrogative possessive [of what] (mixed)i.e. the genitive of the interrogative pronoun wer:
 Masculine/Feminine/Neuter/Plural: wessen

NOT: Die Soldaten dessen Armee (correct: Die Soldaten dieser Armee)

Dative and genitive cases

German articles and pronouns in the genitive and dative cases directly indicate the actions of owning and giving without needing additional words (indeed, this is their function), which can make German sentences appear confusing to English-speaking learners. The gender matches the receiver's gender (not the object's gender) for the dative case, and the owner's gender for the genitive.

 Dative: Ich gebe die Karten dem MannI give the cards to the man. 
 Genitive: Die Entwicklung unseres DorfesThe growth of our village.

For further details as to the usage of German cases, see German grammar.

References

Articles
Articles